VMF may refer to:
Variable Message Format, a military message format
Abbreviation of :
The Soviet Navy (until 1990) 
The Russian Navy (before 1917 and from 1991)
 East Franconian German, ISO 639-3 language code vmf